A flyway is a bird migration flight path

Flyway may also refer to:
 Flyway (magazine), Iowa State University journal
 Flyway (software), a Java database migration framework
 Flyways Linhas Aéreas, a Brazilian airline
 Flyway Club, a shooting club in North Carolina, US
 Flyway Film Festival, a festival in Pepin, Wisconsin, US

See also
 Airway (disambiguation)
 Flight plan (disambiguation)
 Flightpath (disambiguation)
 Fly Away (disambiguation)
 Skyway (disambiguation)